Coleophora accadica is a moth of the family Coleophoridae.

References

accadica
Moths described in 1994